Tirthapati Institution is a Bengali/English-medium Higher Secondary (10+2) school located in Rash Behari Avenue, Gariahat, Kolkata, West Bengal, India. It was established in 1932. It is situated on the Deshapriya Park.

References 

Boys' schools in India
Primary schools in West Bengal
High schools and secondary schools in West Bengal
Schools in Kolkata
Educational institutions established in 1932
1932 establishments in India